Pleomorphism may refer to:

 Pleomorphism (cytology), variability in the size and shape of cells and/or their nuclei
 Pleomorphism (microbiology), the ability of some bacteria to alter their shape or size in response to environmental conditions
 A life cycle of certain fungi where different stages have different morphology, see Teleomorph, anamorph and holomorph